Tracy Ryan may refer to:
Tracy Ryan (writer), Australian poet and novelist
Tracy Ryan (actress), Canadian actress
Tracy Ryan, in United States gubernatorial elections, 2002